Itzhak is a Hebrew given name and surname, meaning Isaac. Notable people with the name include:

Given name
 Itzhak Arnon (1909–2005), Israeli agronomist
 Itzhak Bars (born 1943), American theoretical physicist at the University of Southern California
 Itzhak Ben David (1931–2007), Israeli cyclist
 Itzhak Bentov (1923–1979), Czech-born Israeli American scientist, inventor, mystic
 Itzhak Brook (born 1941), Adjunct Professor of Pediatrics and Medicine at Georgetown University School of Medicine
 Itzhak de Laat (born 1994), Dutch short track speed skater
 Itzhak Drucker (born 1947), Israeli football defender
 Itzhak Fintzi (born 1933), Bulgarian film and stage actor
 Itzhak Gilboa (born 1963), Israeli economist
 Itzhak Fisher, vice president at Nielsen Holdings
 Itzhak Katzenelson (1886–1944), Jewish teacher, poet and dramatist
 Itzhak Levanon (born 1944), Israeli ambassador to Egypt from 2009 to 2011
 Isaac Luria, also known as Itzhak Luria (1534–1572), Ottoman Syrian rabbi and mystic
 Itzhak Luria (born 1940), Israeli olympic swimmer
 Itzhak Mamistvalov, Israeli Paralympic swimmer
Itzhak Nir (born 1940), Israeli Olympic competitive sailor
 Itzhak Nissan, chairman and CEO of Meteor Aerospace Ltd., a privately owned Israeli Defense and Security company that Nissan founded
 Itzhak Perlman (born 1945), Israeli-American violinist, conductor, and pedagogue
 Itzhak Rashkovsky (born 1955), Russian-Israeli violinist and pedagogue
 Itzhak Schneor (1925–2011), Israeli footballer and manager
 Itzhak Shum (born 1948), Israeli footballer and manager
 Itzhak Stern (1901–1969), Polish-Israeli Jewish man who worked for Oskar Schindler and assisted him in his rescue activities
 Itzhak Vissoker (born 1944), Israeli footballer

Surname
 Gil Itzhak (born 1993), Israeli footballer
 Miron Itzhak (born 1953), psychologist
 Ran Itzhak (born 1987), Israeli footballer

See also
 Isaac (name)
 Yitzhak

Hebrew masculine given names